The Lehi Museum, also known as Beit Yair, is placed in the house where the Lehi commander, Avraham Stern (Yair) was assassinated. The museum has two floors and each has its own story. In addition, the offices of the Lehi organization are located on the ground floor, where they are working to preserve and perpetuate the legacy of Lehi.  The museum is located at 8 Stern Street in Tel Aviv's Florentin neighborhood. The museum opened in 1985 and is operated by the Museum Department of the Ministry of Defense.
Visit the Museum is a journey to the period before the creation of Israel. It allows authentic observation to the period when Zionist settlement struggled for its survival while learning the history of Zionist settlement through visions and audiovisual represent.

Avraham Stern (Yair) 

Museum visit begins on the top floor. in this floor was the apartment of Tova and Moshe Savorai. Stern lived there on his last three weeks. On 12 February 1942, British officers came to the Savorais' rented apartment. they were looking for Stern. Stern was hiding in the wardrobe and Tova opened the door to the officers. Only on the second search of the house, on this day, they found Stern. Officer Geoffrey J. Morton
, came later, and ordered Stern to stand next to the window. Then three shots were fired. As a result, Stern was mortally wounded and soon died. on the right side of The frame of the window there is a hole which remains as a result from one of the bullets fired at Stern. This floor of the museum is dedicated to the life story of Stern. the Floor preserved original furnishings since 1942 and even in their original location.

Also on this floor are excerpts from poems written by Stern.

Lehi organization 

The second floor is dedicated to the Lehi organization. In this floor the Lehi organization development is described in chronological order. The Floor is devoted to operations carried out against the British. Most of them were made after the death of Stern. Lehi organization operated until Israel was established. After the death of Stern many members of the organization were arrested. At that time Most of the management was appointed from the Lehi center who was running by three key members of the organization: Nathan Yellin-Mor, Yitzhak Shamir and Israel Eldad. Each one of them had a different area of responsibility. The Organization carried out daring operations and on this floor of the museum every operation has a model that shows it. There are also displays that illustrate the prosecutions of some of the Lehi fighters and there is also a display of the propaganda carried out by the organization. Alongside this there is also a view of the activities of Lehi that was carried out overseas.

See also 
 List of museums in Israel
 Lehi (group)

References 
 Israel Eldad, The First Tithe (Tel Aviv: Jabotinsky Institute, 2008), 
 Zev Golan, Stern: The Man and His Gang (Tel Aviv, 2011), 
 Avaraham Stern ("Yair"), by Hillel Kook at www.etzel.org.il - Profile at the Irgun website

Notes

External links 
 The Lehi Museum
 The Lehi Museum Blog
 Lehi Association

Museums in Tel Aviv
History museums in Israel
Military and war museums in Israel
Monuments and memorials in Israel
1985 establishments in Israel
Museums established in 1985
Lehi (militant group)